Miguel Antonio Otero may refer to:

 Miguel Antonio Otero (born 1829) (1829–1882), prominent politician of the New Mexico Territory, delegate to the U.S. Congress
 Miguel Antonio Otero (born 1859) (1859–1944), son of previous, governor of New Mexico Territory
 Miguel Antonio Otero, Jr. (1892–1977), son of previous, district court judge in Santa Fe, New Mexico, husband of aviator Katherine Stinson